This list of Vogue Korea cover models is a catalog of cover models who have appeared on the cover of Vogue Korea, the Korean edition of Vogue magazine, starting with the magazine's first issue in August 1996.

1990s

1996

1997

1998

1999

2000s

2000

2001

2002

2003

2004

2005

2006

2007

2008

2009

2010s

2010

2011

2012

2013

2014

2015

2016

2017

2018

2019

2020s

2020

2021

2022

2023

External links 
 
 Vogue Korea at Models.com

Korea
Vogue
South Korean fashion